Crystal City is a city in eastern Jefferson County, Missouri, United States. The population was 4,855 at the 2010 census. It was 4,247 at the 2000 census.

Crystal City and its neighbor Festus are often collectively known as the "Twin Cities".

History
Crystal City was originally called New Detroit. A post office called Crystal City has been in operation since 1872. In the 1860s, Pittsburgh Plate Glass Company opened a glass manufacturing plant, which is the origin of the city's name. Currently, the PPG plant property remains empty and undeveloped. It was purchased by Wings Enterprises in the mid-2000s with the intentions of constructing an iron ore smelter on the property. In the early 2000s, the state of Missouri forced Doe Run Company to purchase 160 homes in Herculaneum after it was found over 56% of children within a quarter-mile (0.4 km) of the plant had high levels of lead in their blood. This prompted greater concern when Crystal City engaged in discussions over building a $1 billion dollar iron-ore smelter on the lands of the abandoned factory.

Geography
Crystal City is located adjacent to the Mississippi River floodplain to the east and the city of Festus to the west.

Demographics

2010 census
As of the census of 2010, there were 4,855 people, 1,894 households, and 1,228 families living in the city. The racial makeup of the city was 93.2% White, 3.7% African American, 0.4% Native American, 0.6% Asian, 0.3% from other races, and 1.9% from two or more races. Hispanic or Latino of any race were 1.0% of the population.

There were 1,894 households, of which 36.0% had children under the age of 18 living with them, 45.9% were married couples living together, 13.7% had a female householder with no husband present, 5.2% had a male householder with no wife present, and 35.2% were non-families. 29.4% of all households were made up of individuals, and 12.3% had someone living alone who was 65 years of age or older. The average household size was 2.47 and the average family size was 3.06.

The median age in the city was 37.1 years. 25.7% of residents were under the age of 18; 7.8% were between the ages of 18 and 24; 25.9% were from 25 to 44; 24.2% were from 45 to 64; and 16.5% were 65 years of age or older. The gender makeup of the city was 47.6% male and 52.4% female.

2000 census
As of the census of 2000, there were 4,247 people, 1,622 households, and 1,111 families living in the city. The racial makeup of the city was 92.11% White, 5.34% African American, 0.26% Native American, 0.52% Asian, 0.07% from other races, and 1.70% from two or more races. Hispanic or Latino of any race were 0.49% of the population.

There were 1,622 households, out of which 32.2% had children under the age of 18 living with them, 51.2% were married couples living together, 13.8% had a female householder with no husband present, and 31.5% were non-families. 28.2% of all households were made up of individuals, and 13.6% had someone living alone who was 65 years of age or older. The average household size was 2.44 and the average family size was 2.97.

In the city, the population was spread out, with 24.0% under the age of 18, 8.5% from 18 to 24, 25.7% from 25 to 44, 21.5% from 45 to 64, and 20.3% who were 65 years of age or older. The median age was 40 years. For every 100 females, there were 87.6 males. For every 100 females age 18 and over, there were 81.1 males.

The median income for a household in the city was $36,117, and the median income for a family was $45,288. Males had a median income of $41,111 versus $23,750 for females. The per capita income for the city was $17,816. About 12.6% of families and 15.2% of the population were below the poverty line, including 21.6% of those under age 18 and 6.3% of those age 65 or over.

Education
Crystal City 47 Public Schools operates one elementary school and Crystal City High School.

The town has a lending library, the Crystal City Public Library.

Notable people
Bill Bradley, former NBA player and United States Senator
Margaret B. Kelly, former Missouri State Auditor 
Danny Kladis, auto racer
Dan LaRose, football player
Tom Santschi (Paul William Santschi), silent film actor

References

External links
 Crystal City's Website
 City-data.com - Crystal City
 Historic maps of Crystal City in the Sanborn Maps of Missouri Collection at the University of Missouri

Missouri populated places on the Mississippi River
Cities in Jefferson County, Missouri
Defunct glassmaking companies
Cities in Missouri